The Worshipful Company of Plumbers is one of the livery companies of the City of London. The organisation received the right to regulate medieval plumbers, who were, among other things, responsible for fashioning cisterns, in 1365. It was incorporated under a royal charter in 1611. Today, the company is no longer a trade association, instead existing as a charitable institution. (The company retains a link to plumbing by awarding medals and prizes in the general building industry.)

The Plumbers' Company ranks thirty-first in the order of precedence of Livery Companies. Its mottoes are Justicia Et Pax, Latin for Justice and Peace, and In God Is All Our Hope.

Court members have included Fiona Woolf and Paul Flatt.

External links
 The Worshipful Company of Plumbers

References

Plumbers
1365 establishments in England